The 1975 IPSC Handgun World Shoot I held at Zürich in Switzerland was the first IPSC Handgun World Shoot, and was won by Ray Chapman of United States using a 1911 in .45 caliber. Ray had been central in the development the sport of practical shooting in the late 1950s. He was seeded as number one before the championship, and shot an almost perfect match dropping only one point. He continued to compete until 1979 when he retired.

Champions
Individual

Teams

See also 
IPSC Rifle World Shoots
IPSC Shotgun World Shoot
IPSC Action Air World Shoot

References

1975
1975 in shooting sports
Shooting competitions in Switzerland
1975 in Swiss sport
International sports competitions hosted by Switzerland